Sanil Shankar Shetty is an Indian  table-tennis player. In 2018 Commonwealth Games held at Gold Coast, Australia, He won gold in men's team event with Sharath Kamal, Anthony Amalraj, Sathiyan Gnanasekaran & Harmeet Desai & bronze in Men's doubles event with Harmeet Desai.

References 

1989 births
Living people
Table tennis players at the 2018 Commonwealth Games
Table tennis players at the 2022 Commonwealth Games
Commonwealth Games medallists in table tennis
Commonwealth Games gold medallists for India
Commonwealth Games bronze medallists for India
Racket sportspeople from Mumbai
Table tennis players at the 2010 Asian Games
Table tennis players at the 2014 Asian Games
Indian male table tennis players
Asian Games competitors for India
Medallists at the 2018 Commonwealth Games
Medallists at the 2022 Commonwealth Games
South Asian Games gold medalists for India
South Asian Games silver medalists for India
South Asian Games medalists in table tennis